Lautaro Manuel Baeza (born 17 February 1990) is an Argentine–born Chilean former footballer. His last club was Sportivo Barracas.

References
 Profile at BDFA 
 

1990 births
Living people
Sportspeople from Buenos Aires Province
Argentine footballers
Argentine expatriate footballers
Citizens of Chile through descent
Chilean footballers
Club Atlético Vélez Sarsfield footballers
Club Atlético Platense footballers
Sportivo Las Parejas footballers
Rangers de Talca footballers
Deportivo Merlo footballers
Sportivo Patria footballers
Sportivo Barracas players
Argentine Primera División players
Primera B Metropolitana players
Chilean Primera División players
Torneo Argentino B players
Primera C Metropolitana players
Torneo Argentino A players
Argentine expatriate sportspeople in Chile
Expatriate footballers in Chile
Association football defenders
Argentine emigrants to Chile
Naturalized citizens of Chile